Pfarrweisach is a municipality in the district of Haßberge in Bavaria in Germany.

Geography

Location 
Pfarrweisach lies in the Main-Rhön Region (Bavarian planning region no. 3).

Subdivisions 
Pfarrweisach is divided into nine sub-municipalities (population in brackets as at: 5 January 2009):

Neighbouring municipalities 
Its neighbouring municipalities (clockwise from the north) are: Maroldsweisach, Seßlach, Untermerzbach, Ebern and Burgpreppach.

References

Haßberge (district)